Louis Bouveault (11 February 1864 – 5 September 1909) was a French scientist who became professor of organic chemistry at the Faculty of Sciences of the University of Paris.
He is known for the Bouveault aldehyde synthesis and the Bouveault–Blanc reduction.

Life

Louis Bouveault was born on 11 February 1864 in Nevers.
He obtained doctorates in Paris in medicine and physical sciences.
Bouveault defended his thesis on β-keto nitriles and their derivatives in Paris in 1890.
He taught for a short period at the Medical Faculty in Lyon, then became a lecturer in general chemistry in Lyon.
He influenced Victor Grignard to take up chemistry in 1894.
In Lyon he investigated syntheses with camphor and terpenes.
He worked with Philippe Barbier on terpene derivatives used in the manufacture of perfumes like citral, rhodinal and geraniol.

Bouveault moved on from Lyon to Lille, Nancy and finally to Paris.
He was appointed professor of organic chemistry at the Faculty of Sciences of the University of Paris.
In 1903 Bouveault and  Gustave Louis Blanc described the Bouveault–Blanc reduction for reduction of esters to the corresponding alcohols in an alcoholic solvent.
In 1904 he described the Bouveault aldehyde synthesis, a formylation of an alkyl or aryl halide to the homologous aldehyde or carbaldehyde.
In 1907 he was elected president of the French Chemical Society.
He died on 5 September 1909.

Bouveault was both an inspiring teacher and a strong researcher.
Albin Haller wrote that he "often takes pleasure in the most daring conceptions, the most risky hypotheses, without being afraid to excite objections, indeed believing in the value of the most lively critiques.

Publications
Bouveault was a prolific author, who published many papers in his short career.
Two longer works:

Notes

Sources

1864 births
1909 deaths
19th-century French chemists
20th-century French chemists
Academic staff of the University of Paris